Mount Richmond Forest Park is a forest park in New Zealand, administered by the Department of Conservation.

Around 80% of the area is covered in bush.

History

The future park was the location of New Zealand's first deadly civilian aviation incident associated with regular passenger air service. On 7 May 1942, a plane flying from Wellington to Nelson hit Mount Richmond, causing both pilots and the three passengers to lose their lives. A subsequent investigation found a burnt out plane and no survivors on the upper slopes of Mount Richmond.

The park was established in 1977.

Te Araroa uses some of the 250 kilometers of tracks and huts in the forest park.

References 

Forest parks of New Zealand
Protected areas of the Marlborough Region
Southland District
1977 establishments in New Zealand
Protected areas established in 1977